Allium madidum, common name mountain swamp onion, is a plant species native to the west-central Idaho (Valley, Adams, and Washington Counties), southern Washington (Walla Walla County) and eastern Oregon. It grows in wet meadows at elevations of 1100–2000 m.

Allium madidum produces 1-3 bulbs with as many as 30 smaller bulbels attached. The full-size bulbs are round to egg-shaped, up to 1.6 cm long. Flowers are bell-shaped, up to 10 mm across; tepals white with green or pink midveins; pollen yellow. Flowers bloom May to July.

References

madidum
Flora of Oregon
Flora of Idaho
Flora of Washington (state)
Onions
Endemic flora of the United States
Taxa named by Sereno Watson
Plants described in 1879
Flora without expected TNC conservation status